Angela Giron (born May 12, 1960) is an American politician who was a Democratic member of the Colorado Senate representing District 3 from 2011 until she was recalled on September 10, 2013, by groups  opposed to her gun control legislation. Giron is the second ever Colorado legislator to have
been successfully recalled in the state's history.

Early career
Senator Giron was appointed to the Colorado State Senate (from District 3) in August, 2010. She replaced Senator Abel Tapia, who resigned to become the director of the Colorado Lottery. She was re-elected later in 2010 and in 2012. At the time of her appointment, District 3 encompassed 89% of Pueblo County and included most of the City of Pueblo, Pueblo West and Beulah.

Prior to her Senate career, Giron worked for the Boys & Girls Club of Pueblo, helping greatly expand and develop the organization. She also served as a congressional aide to U.S. Senators Ken Salazar and Michael Bennet.

2013 recall

On June 10, 2013, some constituents of Giron turned in 13,466 signatures to recall her from political office, passing the threshold of 11,285 signatures needed to trigger a recall election. Of those 13,466 signatures, 12,648 were found to be valid and a recall election was allowed to proceed, making her the second politician in the history of the state of Colorado to be subject to recall. The recall election took place on September 10, 2013, and Giron was recalled by a margin of 56 percent to 43.9 percent, making her the second politician in Colorado state history to lose a recall election; John Morse, recalled on the same day, was the first.

Senator Giron made unsubstantiated claims after her surprising loss that her opponents had engaged in "voter suppression" to oust her from office. She was favored by many to win the election, and her 12-point defeat was a substantial surprise. Senator Giron stated during a CNN interview by anchor/correspondent Brooke Baldwin shortly after her ouster "'We know what really happened here ... ,' Giron said. 'What this story really is about, it's about voter suppression.'" CNN's Baldwin moved the interview away from the alleged suppression back toward the issues that led to the recall.

The unsubstantiated suppression charge had initially been raised by Democratic National Committee (DNC) chair Debbie Wasserman Schultz. Wasserman-Schultz said in a statement released by the DNC on September 11, 2013: "The recall elections in Colorado were defined by the vast array of obstacles that special interests threw in the way of voters for the purpose of reversing the will of the legislature and the people. This was voter suppression, pure and simple."

Colorado's largest newspaper, The Denver Post, whose editorial board has supported the gun control measures championed by Senator Giron, took issue with the Senator's accusations. In an editorial published September 13, 2013, the Post noted: "We opposed the recall, but we also oppose lurid attempts to portray Colorado's recall elections as somehow illegitimate." The editorial also took exception to Giron's charge that her supporters were not able to get to the polls: "People who supported her 'weren't able' to get to the polls? Nonsense. They were no less able to get to the polls than folks on the other side. If a disproportionate number of her supporters failed to vote, it's because they chose not to."

Subsequent career
Giron considered running for the Democratic nomination for Secretary of State in the 2014 elections, but she decided against it.

Personal life
Giron has a daughter, Melanie, and a son-in-law, Adam; she is married to Steve Nawrocki, a Pueblo City Councilman. She spoke at the Latina Youth Conference in Wyoming in 2017

Electoral history

References

External links
State Senator Angela Giron - District 3 at the Colorado State Senate
Angela Giron for State Senator
 

Democratic Party Colorado state senators
Hispanic and Latino American women in politics
Living people
Recalled state legislators of the United States
Women state legislators in Colorado
Colorado State University Pueblo alumni
American gun control activists
People from Pueblo, Colorado
1960 births
21st-century American politicians
21st-century American women politicians